Lucia is both a feminine given name and a surname. It comes from the Latin word Lux meaning 'light'. It is the feminine form of the Roman praenomen Lucius and can be alternatively spelled as Lucy. It is used in Romanian, Italian, Spanish (Lucía), Portuguese (Lúcia), English, and Slavic languages.

Given name 
 Sister Lúcia (1907–2005), one of three children who claimed to have seen and heard the Virgin Mary
Lucia H. Faxon Additon (1847–1919), American writer, teacher, social reformer
Lucia Albano (born 1965), Italian politician
Lucia Aniello (born 1983), Italian-born American director, writer, and producer
Lucia Berlin (1936–2004), American short story writer
Lucia Bosè (1931–2020), Italian actress
Lucia Bosetti (b. 1989), Italian volleyball player
Lucia Bronze, better known as Lucy Bronze (b. 1991), English footballer, played as Lucia Bronze at some youth level
 Lucia Cifarelli (b. 1970), member of industrial band KMFDM
 Lucía Etxebarria de Asteinza (b. 1966), Spanish writer
 Łucja Frey (Polish spelling) (1889–1942?), Polish physician and neurologist
 Lucia Galeazzi Galvani (1743–1788), Italian scientist 
Lucía Hiriart de Pinochet (born 1922), widow of former Chilean dictator Augusto Pinochet
Lucía Jiménez (born 1978), Spanish actress
Lucia Joyce (1907–1982), dancer
 Lucia Kimani (b. 1981), Bosnian athlete
 Lucia Krim, American child killed along with her brother by their nanny in 2012
Lucía Lacarra (born 1975), Spanish ballet dancer
 Lucía López (b. 1974), Spanish field hockey player
 Lúcia Machado de Almeida (1910–2005), Brazilian writer
 Lucia Mendez (b. 1955), Mexican actress and singer
 Lucia Micarelli (b. 1983), American violinist
 Lucia Migliaccio, Duchess of Floridia (1770–1826)
 Lúcia Moniz (b. 1976), Portuguese singer and actress
 Lucia Pamela (1904–2002), musician
Lúcia Petterle (born 1949), Brazilian doctor and beauty queen
Lucía Pinochet (born 1943), daughter of former Chilean dictator Augusto Pinochet and Lucía Hiriart de Pinochet
 Lucia Popp (1939–1993), operatic soprano
Lucia Rijker (born 1967), Dutch professional boxer
Lucía Rodríguez (athlete) (born 1998), Spanish athlete
Lucia Runkle (1844–1922), American editorial writer
Lucia Siposová (born 1980), stage, television and film actress
 Lucia Toader (1960–2013), Romanian rower
Lucía Topolansky (born 1944), Uruguayan politician
Lucía Trasviña Waldenrath, Mexican politician
Lucía Jiménez Vicente (b. 1997), Spanish field hockey player
Lucía Zaráte (1863–1890), Mexican entertainer
Lucia Zedner (born 1961), British legal scholar

Surname 
 Bruno Lucia (b. 1960), Australian stand-up comedian and performer
 Carmen Lucia (1902–1985), union organizer in the United States
 Douglas Lucia (b. 1963), U.S. Catholic bishop
 Fernando de Lucia, Italian tenor
 Gina Lucia, American artist
 Ray Lucia (born 1950), American financial advisor, author and radio and television host

Fictional characters 
 Lucia, a playable character in Contra: Shattered Soldier, and boss in its sequel, Neo Contra
 Lucia Morgan, a playable character in Final Fight 3 and Street Fighter V
 Lucia, a playable character in Fire Emblem: Path of Radiance and Fire Emblem: Radiant Dawn.
 Lucia Raregroove, a major enemy in the Japanese manga/anime series Rave Master
 Lucia (Suikoden), a character in Suikoden II and Suikoden III
 Lucia von Bardas, Marvel Comics villainess
 Lucia, a popstar and golfer in Pangya
 Lucia, the main heroine of Lunar: Eternal Blue
 Lucia Nanami, the main protagonist of Mermaid Melody Pichi Pichi Pitch series 
 Lucia Konohana, a main heroine in the Key visual novel Rewrite
 Lucia, a playable character in Devil May Cry 2

See also
 Lucia (disambiguation)
 Santa Lucia (disambiguation)

References

English feminine given names
Italian feminine given names
Slavic feminine given names
Spanish feminine given names
Romanian feminine given names